Charley Pride Sings Heart Songs is the thirteenth studio album by the American country music artist of the same name. It was released in 1971 on the RCA Victor label (catalog no. LSP-4617) and resulted in Pride being awarded the Grammy for “Best Country Vocal Performance, Male” at the 15th Annual Grammy Awards.

The album was awarded four-and-a-half stars from the web site AllMusic. It debuted on Billboard magazine's country album chart on November 27, 1971, spent 16 weeks at the No. 1 spot, and remained on the chart for a total of 36 weeks. The album also included the No. 1 hit single "Kiss an Angel Good Mornin'".

Track listing

Charts

Weekly charts

Year-end charts

See also
 Charley Pride discography

References

1971 albums
Charley Pride albums
albums produced by Jack Clement
RCA Records albums